Taltali is a Bangladeshi village in the upazila of Kachua, Chandpur District in Chittagong Division.

See also
 List of villages in Bangladesh

References

Populated places in Chandpur District
Villages in Chandpur District
Villages in Chittagong Division